The Ninety-Two Resolutions were drafted by Louis-Joseph Papineau and other members of the Parti patriote of Lower Canada in 1834. The resolutions were a long series of demands for political reforms in the British-governed colony.

Papineau had been elected speaker of the Legislative Assembly of Lower Canada in 1815. His party constantly opposed the unelected colonial government, and in 1828 he helped draft an early form of the resolutions, essentially a list of grievances against the colonial administration. To ensure that the views of the Legislative Assembly be understood by the British House of Commons, the Parti patriote had sent its own delegation to London in order to submit a memoir and a petition signed by 78,000 people.

On February 28, 1834, Papineau presented the Ninety-Two Resolutions to the Legislative Assembly, which were approved and sent to London. The resolutions included, among other things, demands for an elected Legislative Council and an Executive Council responsible before the house of representatives. Under the Constitutional Act of 1791, Lower Canada was given an elected legislative assembly, but members of the upper house were appointed by the governor of the colony. 

In the resolutions, the elected representatives once again reiterated their loyalty to the British Crown but expressed frustration that the government of London had been unwilling to correct the injustices caused by the past governments of the colony.

Papineau's resolutions were ignored for almost three years; meanwhile, the Legislative Assembly did all it could to oppose the un-elected upper houses while avoiding outright rebellion. British Colonial Secretary Lord John Russell eventually responded to them by issuing ten resolutions of his own (the Russell Resolutions). All of the Legislative Assembly's demands were rejected.

The ten resolutions reached Canada in 1837, and many of Papineau's reformists began to agitate for a rebellion. See the Lower Canada Rebellion.

References

External links
 
 English: The Ninety-Two Resolutions of the Legislative Assembly of Lower Canada
 Français: Les 92 Résolutions de 1834 

1834 in Lower Canada
92 Resolutions
Lower Canada Rebellion
February 1834 events
1834 documents